William Henry Wylie (7 December 1891 – 7 July 1974) was an Australian rules footballer who played with Essendon in the Victorian Football League (VFL).

Notes

External links 

1891 births
1974 deaths
Australian rules footballers from Victoria (Australia)
Essendon Football Club players